Puli Meka is an Indian Telugu-language crime thriller series created by Kona Venkat and directed by Chakravarthy Reddy, starring Lavanya Tripathi and Aadi Saikumar in lead roles. The series is produced by Kona Venkat under the Kona Film Corporation (KFC) banner, with music by Praveen Lakkaraju, cinematography by Ram K Mahesh, and editing by Chota K Prasad. It follows a serial killer on a cop-killing spree which rattles the police department. The series premiered on ZEE5 on 24 February, 2023.

Cast 

 Lavanya Tripathi as Kiran Prabha IPS
 Aadi Saikumar as Dr. Prabakar Sharma, a forensic expert and Kiran's future husband
 Suman as Commissioner Anurag Narayan
 Goparaju Ramana as Diwakar Sharma, Prabakar's and Karuna's father
 Raja Chembolu as Karunakar Sharma, Prabakar's elder brother. 
 Siri Hanumanthu as Pallavi, a former chess champion and Kiran's best friend. 
 Srinivas as Panduranga Rao, Kiran's father a former IAS
 Spandhana Palli as Swetha

Release 
The trailer of the series was released by actor Ram Charan on 17 February, 2023.

Episodes

Season 1

Reception

Critical response 
Abhilasha Cherukuri of The Indian Express in her review stated "Puli Meka leaves people with an exciting cliffhanger in the end, and the series will continue to have a winning run as long as it keeps  its stakes high and twists sharp."

Kota Saumya of Telangana Today stated "Suspenseful thrillers rely heavily on the music to create an exciting vibe but the music by Praveen Lakkaraju is nothing noteworthy. However, as far as weekend watching goes, ‘Puli Meka’ is a good bet."

Neeshita Nyayapati at The Times of India wrote "Puli Meka is an eight-episode-long series that gets off on a shaky start and finds its footing as it progresses, but it's not enough."

References

External links 

 
 Puli Meka on ZEE5

Telugu-language web series
Crime thriller web series